Asid ibn Zafir al-Sulami was a Jaziran general of the Umayyad Caliphate who fought in Transcaucasia under Muhammad ibn Marwan and his son, Marwan ibn Muhammad, in the early 8th century. His origin is unknown, but his descendants remained important in the region for long after. This his son Yazid and his grandsons, Khalid and Ahmad, served as governors of Arminiya.

See also
Bajadda

Sources
 

8th-century deaths
Generals of the Abbasid Caliphate
Arminiya
Umayyad people of the Arab–Khazar wars
Year of birth unknown
8th-century Arabs
Banu Sulaym